The commercial minus sign is a typographical and mathematical symbol used in commercial and financial documents in some European languages, in specific contexts.

In some commercial and financial documents, especially in Germany and Scandinavia, the commercial minus sign is used to signify a negative remainder of a division operation. The symbol is also used in the margins of letters to indicate an enclosure, where the upper point is sometimes replaced with the corresponding number.

The Uralic Phonetic Alphabet uses commercial minus signs to denote borrowed forms of a sound.

In Finland, it is used as a symbol for a correct response (the check mark indicates an incorrect response).

Typographic variant
In Germany, the form  was historically an alternative to the formal glyph, since this could be conveniently typed on a typewriter. It also provides a convenient alternative means for typing on a modern keyboard, without needing to resort to Unicode input.

In Japan, the triangle (either △ or ▲) is used as the commercial minus sign.

See also
 Obelusthe predecessor of this variant
 
 
  
Arabic percent sign  (almost identical except that the dots are squares rather than circles)

References 

Typographical symbols
Mathematical symbols
de:Minuszeichen